Since the inception of the French football league competition, Ligue 1, in 1948, more than 200 players from 49 countries have scored three goals (a hat-trick) or more in a single match. The French former striker Thadée Cisowski is the player with the most Ligue 1 hat-tricks in history, with 22 scored between clubs Metz and RC Paris. The foreign players with the most hat-tricks are Gunnar Andersson of Sweden and Delio Onnis of Argentina, each of whom scored twelve. Algerian former footballer Ahmed Oudjani (in a 10–2 win for Lens against RC Paris on 8 December 1963), Malian former footballer Salif Keïta (in an 8–0 win for Saint-Étienne against Sedan on 4 June 1971) and Argentine former footballer Carlos Bianchi (in a 6–1 win for Reims against Paris Saint-Germain on 9 August 1974) each scored six goals in a match, the most ever scored in a single Ligue 1 game.

Hat-tricks

1940s

1950s

1960s

1970s

1980s

1990s

2000s

2010s

2020s

Statistics

Multiple hat-tricks
The following table lists the minimum number of hat-tricks scored by players who have scored three or more hat-tricks.

Players in bold are still active in Ligue 1.

Hat-tricks by nationality

Notes

 SFR Yugoslavia (YUG, 1945–1992) split into Republic of Bosnia and Herzegovina (BIH, 1992–1995), Croatia (CRO, 1992–present), Republic of Macedonia (MKD, 1993–2019), Slovenia (SVN, 1992–present), and FR Yugoslavia (YUG, 1992–2003).
 Czechoslovakia (TCH, 1918–1992) split into the Czech Republic (CZE, 1993–present) and Slovakia (SVK, 1993–present).
 Republic of Bosnia and Herzegovina (BIH, 1992–1995), as a conclusion of the Bosnian War, reconstituted into Bosnia and Herzegovina (BIH, 1995–present).
 FR Yugoslavia (YUG, 1992–2003), while being reconstituted from a federal republic into a state union, was renamed Serbia and Montenegro (SCG, 2003–2006).
 Serbia and Montenegro (SCG, 2003–2006), split into Serbia (SRB, 2006–present) and Montenegro (MNE, 2006–present).
 Republic of Macedonia was known internationally as the Former Yugoslav Republic of Macedonia (FYROM) from 1993 until 2019 due to a naming dispute with Greece. From 2019, as a result of an agreement between the two disputing parties, the country was renamed North Macedonia (MKD).

References

Hat-tricks
Ligue 1 Hat-tricks
Ligue 1